Chaillé-sous-les-Ormeaux is a former commune in the Vendée department in the Pays de la Loire region in western France. On 1 January 2016, it was merged into the new commune of Rives-de-l'Yon.

Geography
The village lies above the right bank of the river Yon, which forms most of the commune's eastern border.

See also
Communes of the Vendée department

References

Former communes of Vendée